is a former Japanese football player.

Playing career
Toriizuka was born in Maebashi on August 7, 1972. After graduating from Tokai University, he joined Japan Football League (JFL) club Cosmo Oil (later Cosmo Oil Yokkaichi) in 1995. He played as regular player from first season. However the club was disbanded end of 1996 season. In 1997, he moved to JFL club Consadole Sapporo. The club won the 2nd place in 1997 and was promoted to J1 League from 1998. However he could not become a regular player. In 1999, he moved to his local club Tonan SC in Prefectural Leagues. He played many matches and the club was promoted to Regional Leagues from 2001. In 2003, he moved to Regional Leagues club Thespa Kusatsu. He played as regular player and the club was promoted to Japan Football League in 2004 and J2 League in 2005. He played as central player for a long time and retired end of 2008 season.

Club statistics

References

External links

1972 births
Living people
Tokai University alumni
Association football people from Gunma Prefecture
Japanese footballers
J1 League players
J2 League players
Japan Football League (1992–1998) players
Japan Football League players
Cosmo Oil Yokkaichi FC players
Hokkaido Consadole Sapporo players
Thespakusatsu Gunma players
Association football midfielders